TBO was a long-running Spanish comic book magazine, published in Barcelona between 1917 and 1998.

TBO is pronounced in Spanish almost the same as "te veo", "I see you". It was so popular that tebeo is now a generic word for "comic book" in Spain.

TBO was far from modern influences in seventies when European comics started to influence Spanish comic magazines. It kept its own style with short stories and ingenuous humour.

In 2016, the Biblioteca de Catalunya, acquired 105 original drawings by different authors and subject, related to the publication.

Published series
Altamiro de la Cueva
Top, a dog comics series drawn by José Cabrero Arnal (a precursor to his later French success Pif le chien)
The Smurfs, as Los tebeítos. When Bruguera acquired the publishing rights, they were named Los pitufos.
Los grandes inventos del TBO, presentados por el profesor Franz de Copenhague, intricate machines reminding of Rube Goldberg machines.
Eustaquio Morcillón
La familia Ulises

References

External links 
 Fund of TBO at Biblioteca de Catalunya

Spanish culture
Comics magazines published in Spain
Magazines established in 1917
Magazines disestablished in 1998
1917 comics debuts
1998 comics endings
Defunct magazines published in Spain
Magazines published in Barcelona
Magazines about comics
1917 establishments in Spain
1998 disestablishments in Spain
Spanish-language magazines